Anuradhapura Airport is a domestic airport serving Anuradhapura in Sri Lanka. It is also a military airbase known as Sri Lanka Air Force Base Anuradhapura or SLAF Base Anuradhapura.

It has one bitumen  runway designated 05/23.

Airlines and destinations

Lodger Squadrons
 No. 6 Helicopter Squadron

See also
 Nissanka Wijeyeratne  (In 1960 Government Agent of Anuradhapura District at the time he is responsible for the establishment of Anuradhapura Airport)

References

External links

Airports in Sri Lanka
Sri Lanka Air Force bases
Buildings and structures in North Central Province, Sri Lanka